The National Archives of Nigeria has its headquarters in Abuja, Nigeria, with branches in Enugu, Ibadan, and Kaduna. As of 2017, the current Director of Archives is Mr. Danjuma Dambring Fer.

History 
Professor Kenneth Onwuka Dike did a survey of Nigerian public records from 1951 to 1953. Based on what was found, he made a recommendation to have a public record office. This led to the founding of the Nigerian Record Office on April 1, 1954. In 1957, the Public Archives Ordinance No. 43 was enacted and became effective on November 14, 1957. It changed the name of the archives to become the National Archives of Nigeria.

The archive was housed at the University of Ibadan until 1958.

The Federal Government provided £51,000 to create the first permanent building in Ibadan in the First Economic Programme, 1955-60. This building officially opened on January 9, 1959.

Past Leadership 

 Kenneth Dike was originally appointed the Government Supervisor of Public Records and then the Director of the Archives from 1954 to 1963. He is also considered to be the father of the Nigerian Archives.
 Lloyd C. Gwam followed soon afterwards on April 1, 1964 to become the Director of the Archives until his death on July 2, 1965.
 S.O. Sowoolu succeeded Mr. Gwam and is credited for starting the expansion of the archives.

Locations 
The National Archives of Nigeria has fifteen offices. The three main archive locations are zonal offices. Each location keeps records of colonial administration relating to its particular region, along with newspapers and official government publications.

Zonal offices 

 Enugu (east, est. 1958)
Ibadan (west, est. 1958)
Kaduna (north)

Branch offices 

Abeokuta (est. 1989)
Abuja (headquarters)
Akure (est. 1985)
Benin (est. 1982)
Calabar (est. 1986)
Ilorin (est. 1985)
Jos (est. 1989)
Lagos
Maiduguri (est. 2005)
Owerri (est. 1986)
Port Harcourt (est. 1986)
 Sokoto (est. 1982)

Professional Memberships

National 

 Historical Society of Nigeria
 Oral History/Tradition Association of Nigeria
 Society of Nigerian Archivists

Regional 

 Society of African Archivists
West African Regional Branch of the International Council on Archives (WARBICA)

International 

 Association of Commonwealth Archivists and Record Managers
International Council on Archives (ICA)
 International Records Management Council

See also 
 National Library of Nigeria
 List of national archives

References

Bibliography
published in 20th century
  (About National Archives)
  
 National Archives of Nigeria (1985). National Archives of Nigeria: Its purpose, development and functions.
  (About National Archives)
  
 
 
 
  
 
 
 

published in 21st century

 Abiola Abioye (2007). "Fifty years of archives administration in Nigeria: lessons for the future". Records Management Journal. 17(1). doi:10.1108/09565690710730697.
  (Includes information about National Archives)
  
 
  
 . Abstract. Paper presented at conference in Senegal "Archives of Post-Independence Africa and its Diaspora"

External links
 Official site
 Federal Ministry of Information and Culture. National Archives of Nigeria (via Archive.org)
 American Historical Association, Archives Wiki. National Archives of Nigeria(detailed listing)
  (video)

Nigeria
Archives in Nigeria
History of Nigeria
Buildings and structures in Ibadan
1954 establishments in Nigeria
Organizations based in Abuja